Maitland is a privately-owned investment holding company. In 2021, its Private and Corporate Client Services business was acquired by Stonehage Fleming and in 2022 its Fund and ManCo business was acquired by Apex Group.

History 

Maitland was founded in 1976 in Luxembourg by the late Eric Pfaff, a  South African lawyer. The group provided legal and tax expertise to South African corporates, including Anglo American plc and De Beers. In due course the executives of those corporates asked for private client services and they started offering offshore services. In 1982, Maitland acquired a fiduciary business in Geneva.

In 2005, Maitland acquired FinSource, a fund administration company based in Cape Town, South Africa, which allowed them to offer sophisticated institutional fund administration services globally from South Africa.

In July 2012, the firm acquired a management company InterOcean Management Services in Mauritius.

In November 2012, the firm acquired Admiral Administration, a hedge fund administrator in the Cayman Islands,  along with its hedge fund technology platform "Advent".

In June 2015, Maitland acquired leading UK-based fund administrator Phoenix Fund Services. This acquisition extended the firms Fund Administration and Transfer Agency offering and increased its scope of services in the UK to include ManCo and CoSec (Investment trusts). 

In 2017, Maitland acquired R&H Fund Services (Guernsey) Limited.

Maitland initiated its robotic process automation (RPA) journey in 2018.

In 2020, MUFG Investor Services acquired select divisions of the firms fund administration business in the Cayman Islands, Halifax, and Dublin.

In 2021, Stonehage Fleming acquired Maitland’s Private Client and Corporate Services business. This transaction was a key step in the refinement of Maitland’s services offering which is now dedicated to Fund Services and Management Company Services.

In 2022, Apex group acquired Maitland’s fund administration and third-party management company businesses leaving the residual Maitland as purely an investment holding group.

Operations 
Maitland’s holding company, Maitland International Holdings, is registered in Malta.

The company operated 4 offices in South Africa, the United Kingdom, Guernsey, and Luxembourg.

Acquisition deals 
2005. Acquisition of FinSource Fund Administration.

2012. Acquisition of Admiral Administration.

2015. Acquisition of Phoenix Fund Services.

2017. Acquisition of R&H Fund Services (Guernsey) Limited.

2020. MUFG Investor Services acquired select divisions of Maitland’s fund administration business.

2021. Stonehage Fleming acquired Maitland’s Private Client and Corporate Services business.

2022. Apex group acquired Maitland’s fund administration and third-party management company businesses leaving the residual Maitland as purely an investment holding group.

References

External links
 Official web site

Financial services companies of Malta
Multinational companies headquartered in Malta